Samantha Foyle (born 16 December 1988 in Redcliffe, QLD) is an Australian professional squash player. As of February 2018, she was ranked number  in the world.

References

1988 births
Living people
Australian female squash players
21st-century Australian women